James Walsh (15 August 1933 – 31 July 1995) was an Irish hurler. At club level he played with Dunnamaggin, John Locke's and a Near South selection and was an All-Ireland Championship winner with the Kilkenny senior hurling team.

Playing career

Walsh first came to prominence at inter-county level during a two-year stint with the Kilkenny minor team. He was a sub on the 1950 side that beat Tipperary in the All-Ireland final, and he was on the 1951 team that fell to Galway. Later, in 1956, he sampled All-Ireland success at junior level, with his brother Tom lining out alongside him at corner-back. The pair assumed the same positions for the Kilkenny senior team in 1957. Walsh went on to win his only senior All-Ireland title that year after beating Waterford in the final. His other honours at senior level include three Leinster Championships and a National Hurling League title. Walsh's grandnephew, Brian Hogan, was Kilkenny's All-Ireland-winning captain in 2011.

Later life and death

Walsh, who remained unmarried throughout his life, worked as a farmer with his brother Pat in Dunnamaggin. He died on 31 July 1995 after suffering a massive seizure while working on his farm.

Honours

Kilkenny
All-Ireland Senior Hurling Championship (1): 1957
Leinster Senior Hurling Championship (3): 1957, 1958, 1959
National Hurling League (1): 1961-62
Oireachtas Cup (2): 1957, 1959
Walsh Cup (5): 1957, 1958, 1959, 1961, 1962
All-Ireland Junior Hurling Championship (1): 1956
Leinster Junior Hurling Championship (1): 1956
All-Ireland Minor Hurling Championship (1): 1950
Leinster Minor Hurling Championship (2): 1950, 1951

References

1933 births
1995 deaths
John Locke's hurlers
Dunnamaggin hurlers
Kilkenny inter-county hurlers
Leinster inter-provincial hurlers
All-Ireland Senior Hurling Championship winners